Lasse Stefanz Stora Julparty is a Lasse Stefanz studio album, released on 4 December 2013, The album managed to top the Swedish albums chart. Despite the title, the album consists of no Christmas songs, but ordinary songs.

Track listing
Coca-cola och en hot burrito
Socker och salt
Varje ensam natt
Du vän i mitt liv
En man i ditt liv
Smokey places
Önska att det vore så	
Bebop Cat
Dela min dröm med mig
Vagabond
Helen
Min rosa Cadillac
Är det så här det ska bli
A-11

Charts

References 

2013 albums
Lasse Stefanz albums
2013 Christmas albums
Christmas albums by Swedish artists